Syrotyne may refer to several places in Ukraine

 Syrotyne, Sievierodonetsk Raion, Luhansk Oblast, village in Sievierodonetsk Raion
 Syrotyne, Svatove Raion, Luhansk Oblast, village in Svatove Raion
 Syrotyne (border checkpoint), border checkpoint in the above village
 Syrotyne, Sumy Oblast, village in Sumy Raion